The Alpini Battalion "Val Brenta" is an inactive battalion of the Italian Army's mountain infantry speciality, the Alpini, which distinguished itself in combat during World War I and World War II.

History

World War I 

The battalion was raised on 15 February 1915 with reservists of the Alpini Battalion "Bassano" of the 6th Alpini Regiment. The battalion's name, like the names of all Alpini battalions raised during World War I with first line reservists, was the name of a valley near the active battalion's depot; in the "Val Brenta" battalion's case the Brenta valley, which extends north from Bassano. As with all Alpini battalions the recruits for the battalions were drafted exclusively from the area surrounding the battalions depot. Initially the battalion fielded the 262nd and 263rd Alpini companies, and received the 274th Alpini Company on 15 December 1916.

The Val Brenta battalion's history is intertwined with the history of the 6th Alpini Regiment, with which it served during World War I. During the war the battalion was awarded a Silver Medal of Military Valour for the defense of Monte Cauriol on 1-5 September 1916 against repeated Austro-Hungarian attacks, during which the battalion lost seven officers and more than 250 soldiers. After the war the battalion was disbanded on 30 April 1920.

World War II 
The battalion was reformed on 27 August 1939 and participated in the Italian invasion of France in June and July 1940. Afterwards the battalion was once more disbanded on 31 October 1940 and the battalion's reservists dismissed.

Cold War 

On 1 July 1963 the XXIII Alpini Fortification Battalion in Innichen was renamed Alpini Battalion "Val Brenta". The battalion was part of the Alpine Brigade "Tridentina" and tasked with manning fortifications in the upper Puster valley, which the Italian Army (correctly) assumed to be one of two main directions of a possible Warsaw Pact advance. Initially the Val Brenta fielded three active and five reserve companies, the latter of which had arrived 30 June 1964 from the disbanded Alpini Battalion "Val Leogra". On 1 November 1976 the Alpini Battalion "Val Cismon" of the Alpine Brigade "Cadore" was disbanded and its four companies transferred to the Val Brenta, which now fielded three active and nine reserve companies with a wartime strength of more than 2,200 men. On 1 July 1979 the Val Brenta received the 253rd Alpini Company from the disbanded Alpini Battalion "Val Chiese" of the Alpine Brigade "Orobica". The structure of the battalion was now:

  Alpini Battalion "Val Brenta", in Bruneck
  Headquarters and Service Company, in Bruneck
  253rd Alpini Company, in Brenner (Type A*) (transferred on 1 July 1979 from the disbanded Alpini Battalion "Val Chiese")
  262nd Alpini Company, in Winnebach (Type A)
  263rd Alpini Company, in Vierschach (Type A)
  264th Alpini Company, in Santo Stefano di Cadore (Type A, transferred on 1 November 1976 from the disbanded Alpini Battalion "Val Cismon"; downgraded to Type C on 30 June 1979 and duties taken over by the 262nd Company)
  265th Alpini Companynote 1, in Santo Stefano di Cadore (Type C*, transferred on 1 November 1976 from the disbanded Alpini Battalion "Val Cismon")
  274th Alpini Companynote 1, in Toblach (Type C)
  277th Alpini Companynote 1, in Höhlenstein (Type C, transferred on 1 November 1976 from the disbanded Alpini Battalion "Val Cismon")
  347th Alpini Companynote 2, in Prags (Type C, transferred on 1 November 1976 from the disbanded Alpini Battalion "Val Cismon")
  351st Alpini Companynote 2, in Bruneck (Type C, ex "Val Leogra")
  352nd Alpini Companynote 2, in Bruneck (Type C, ex "Val Leogra")
  353rd Alpini Companynote 1, in Percha (Type C, ex "Val Leogra")
  354th Alpini Companynote 2, in Bruneck (Type C, ex "Val Leogra")
  355th Alpini Companynote 2, in Bruneck (Type C, ex "Val Leogra")

 Type A = fortification fully equipped, provisioned and manned; close support platoon onsite
 Type B = fortification fully equipped, provisioned and manned; close support platoon off site
 Type C = fortification fully equipped; provisions, crew and close support platoon off site

The fortifications the Val Brenta would man in case of war with the Warsaw Pact had been built as the Alpine Wall in the early stages of World War II. The Val Brenta was to man the following bunker systems with the aim to deny enemy forces passage through the Puster and Piave valleys:

 Winnebach: 9 bunker, 203 men, 262nd Alpini Company (Italian Wikipedia: Sbarramento Prato Drava)
 Vierschach: 6 bunker, 180 men, 263rd Alpini Company (Italian Wikipedia: Sbarramento Versciaco)
 Kreuzbergpass: 7 bunker, 247 men, 264th Alpini Company (Italian Wikipedia: Sbarramento Passo Monte Croce Comelico)
 Val Frison: 3 bunker, ? men, 265th Alpini Company (Italian Wikipedia: Sbarramento Val Frison)
 Toblach: 10 bunker, 304 men, 274th Alpini Company (Italian Wikipedia: Sbarramento Dobbiaco)
 Landro Nord: 3 bunker, 150 men, 277th Alpini Company (Italian Wikipedia: Sbarramento della Val di Landro)
 Prags: 2 bunker, 116 men, 347th Alpini Company (Italian Wikipedia: Sbarramento di Braies)
 Antholz: 6 bunker, 164 men, 351st Alpini Company (Italian Wikipedia: Sbarramento Anterselva)
 Olang: 10 bunker, 373 men, 352nd Alpini Company (Italian Wikipedia: Sbarramento Rasun-Valdaora)
 Percha: 7 bunker, 223 men, 353rd Alpini Company (Italian Wikipedia: Sbarramento di Perca)
 Saalen: 4 bunker, 113 men, 354th Alpini Company (Italian Wikipedia: Sbarramento di Sares)
 Mühlbach: 5 bunker, 141 men, 355th Alpini Company (Italian Wikipedia: Sbarramento Chiusa di Rio)

With fixed fortifications becoming obsolete the battalion was disbanded on 23 August 1986 with only the 262nd Alpini Company remaining on active duty. After the battalion was disbanded its war flag was transferred to the shrine of the flags at the Vittoriano in Rome.

External links
 Battaglione Alpini "Val Brenta" on vecio.it

Sources 
 Franco dell'Uomo, R. di Rosa: "L'Esercito Italiano verso il 2000 - Volume Secondo - Tomo I", Rome 2001, Stato Maggiore dell'Esercito - Ufficio Storico, page: 504

References 

Alpini Battalions of Italy